Barmouth station was a railroad station in Lower Merion, Pennsylvania. Located on East Levering Mill Road, the station was a stop on the Pennsylvania Railroad's Schuylkill Branch, and later became a part of SEPTA's Ivy Ridge Line (then called R6 Ivy Ridge).

The station, and all of those north of Cynwyd station, was closed in May 1986 when the integrity of the Pencoyd Viaduct crossing the Schuylkill River and Schuylkill Expressway was questioned. In 2009, SEPTA leased the line to Lower Merion Township, who dismantled the tracks for the Cynwyd Heritage Trail. The last remnants of the station, the platforms and a stone shelter, were demolished in 2011 to make room for the trail parking lot.

The Barmouth station site bisects West Laurel Hill Cemetery and Westminster Cemetery.

References

External links
Cynwyd Heritage trail website

Railway stations closed in 1986
Former SEPTA Regional Rail stations
Former Pennsylvania Railroad stations
Former railway stations in Montgomery County, Pennsylvania
Lower Merion Township, Pennsylvania
1986 disestablishments in Pennsylvania